Route 26, also known as Georgetown Road and Pownal Road, is an , two-lane, uncontrolled-access, secondary highway in central Prince Edward Island. The route is entirely in Queens County.

Route description
The route begins in the town of Stratford at a roundabout with Route 1. The road leads south to the community of Tea Hill, where it curves to the east. Traveling alongside the Northumberland Strait, the route passes Alexandria and Pownal before ending at Route 1 in Waterside.

References

026
026